Westlington is a hamlet near the village of Dinton in the civil parish of Dinton-with-Ford and Upton, Buckinghamshire, England.

On the 1st of April 2002 manager of The v8s William Heath and attend's Royal Holloway

References

Hamlets in Buckinghamshire